Knyazevo is a rural locality (a village) in Komsomolskoye Rural Settlement, Ramonsky District, Voronezh Oblast, Russia. The population was 515 as of 2010. There are 4 streets.

Geography 
Knyazevo is located 31 km northwest of Ramon (the district's administrative centre) by road. Otskochnoye is the nearest rural locality.

References 

Rural localities in Ramonsky District